Saleh Hasan Sumai (born 1956– ) is a Yemeni politician currently serving as the governor of Al-Mahwait Governorate since 2016.

Biography 
He was born in 1956 in Hasn Saleh, a village in al-Mahwait Governorate. He received basic education in Sana'a and then entered Police Academy in Sana'a and graduated in 1975. He later joined the Faculty of Sharia and Law, Sanaa University, and graduated in 1980. In 1982 he obtained a master's degree in philosophy of law from Ain Shams University. He held many government positions, including governor of Marib Governorate in 1999, minister of Expatriates Affairs in 2007, minister of Electricity and Energy in 2011, and governor of Al-Mahwait Governorate in 2016.

References 

1956 births
Electricity ministers of Yemen
Governors of Marib
Governors of Al Mahwit Governorate
Sanaa University alumni
Ain Shams University alumni
21st-century Yemeni politicians
Ministers of expatriates affairs of Yemen
People from Al Mahwit Governorate
Living people
Mujawar Cabinet
Basindawa Cabinet